Ritchie Bros. Auctioneers (RBA), or simply Ritchie Bros., is a public company. Its common shares are traded on the Toronto  and  New York 

exchanges under the ticker symbol RBA.

History

The Ritchie Brothers 
Ritchie Bros. Auctioneers was established in Kelowna, British Columbia, Canada. A Canadian company which the three Ritchie brothers – Ken, John and Dave Ritchie – took over the OK Used Furniture Store from their father in 1955. They entered the auction business in 1958 when they needed CA$2,000 to pay a bank debt on short notice. A friend suggested they conduct an auction to get rid of some surplus inventory from the furniture store. They conducted their first auction at the Scout Hall in Kelowna in 1958 and discovered a new way of doing business.

Starting with that first auction at the Scout Hall, Ritchie Bros. maintained a strict policy of conducting unreserved auctions – meaning there were no minimum bids and no reserve prices. The brothers also established a policy of not allowing bid-ins or buybacks by the sellers.

The brothers began conducting auctions more regularly and in 1958 incorporated Ritchie Bros. Auction Galleries Ltd. to formalize their new business. Ritchie Bros. began selling used equipment in the 1960s. In 1963 Dave Ritchie moved to Vancouver, B.C. and rented an auction site on S.E. Marine Drive. He set up the company's first equipment auction in Vancouver shortly after.

The Ritchie brothers conducted their first major unreserved industrial auction in Radium Hot Springs, British Columbia on June 7, 1963. They sold CA$663,000 of equipment in one day – by far the largest auction in the company's history.

The success of the Radium Hot Springs auction convinced the brothers that they could make more money auctioning used equipment than selling furniture, so they sold their furniture store in Kelowna and went into the auction business full-time.

Ritchie Bros. Auctioneers established one of the trademarks of its auctions at the Radium Hot Springs auction. It was raining on the day of the auction. Instead of making the bidders walk around in the rain during the auction, they set up the auction under the eaves of a nearby shop and drove the equipment in to be sold piece by piece. The crowd stayed dry and the ramp-and-stage method became a fixture at Ritchie Bros. auctions thereafter.

50 years of unreserved industrial auctions 
On June 7, 2013, Ritchie Bros. celebrated 50 years since the company's first major unreserved industrial auction in Radium Hot Springs, British Columbia. It was at this Radium Hot Springs auction that Ritchie Bros. adopted the ramp-and-stage approach for selling all mobile equipment. This approach involves a staging area —designed as a ramp— located in front of a viewing theater, where bidders sit waiting for mobile equipment to come to “center stage.” Each piece of equipment is numbered and, once it comes to rest at the center of the ramp, the auctioneer begins asking for bids. The crowd of bidders signals their bid increments to roving “bid catchers,” who in turn signal the auctioneer when a bid is made. The auctioneer increases the call price until there are no more bids being placed. At a Ritchie Bros. auction, bids are called until no more are forthcoming in approximately one minute, when the auctioneer calls that the item has been “sold!” to the highest bidder.

The company has pioneered the ramp-and-stage method and unreserved industrial auctions around the world ever since the auction at Radium Hot Springs on June 7, 1963.

The early auction years 
Most of the company's earliest auctions were held in British Columbia. Ritchie Bros. began expanding into other parts of Canada in the mid-1960s, conducting its first auctions in Alberta (in 1964), the Yukon (1964), Saskatchewan (1965), Manitoba (1968), and other parts of Eastern Canada shortly thereafter.

In 1965, Ken Ritchie left the company to spend more time with his family and the company's name was changed from Ritchie Bros. Auction Galleries Ltd. to Ritchie Bros. Auctioneers Ltd. Ken established his own auction company, but returned to work with his brothers in 1968. He stayed with Ritchie Bros. Auctioneers until 1980.

In 1968, Ritchie Bros. Auctioneers held its first auction with gross proceeds in excess of CA$1 million, in Edmonton, Alberta, Canada. Edmonton was also the site of the company's first permanent auction site (on company-owned land), which was established in 1976. Until then, Ritchie Bros. had been conducting its auctions on leased land.

Expansion in the U.S. 
Ritchie Bros. established its first presence outside Canada in 1969 when it became incorporated in Washington, USA. The company held its first auction outside Canada in 1970, in Beaverton, Oregon, and gradually began expanding throughout the United States.

In 1974, John Ritchie left the company, selling his share of the business to his brother Dave. In 1975, Dave Ritchie – the sole company shareholder – decided to sell partnerships in Ritchie Bros. Auctioneers to some of his key employees: Dick Bartel, C. Russell (“Russ”) Cmolik, Ken Ritchie, and Bill Gronberg. Over the coming years, the partnership expanded to include Bob Carswell, Marvin Chantler, Ed Banser, Roger Rummel, Bob Brawley, Ken Asbury, John Wild, Marty Pope, Mark Clarke, Don Chalmers, Sylvain Touchette, Frank McFadden, and Mike Ritchie. When Ritchie Bros. went public in 1998, Ken Ritchie and Bill Gronberg no longer owned shares in the company.

By 1985, Ritchie Bros. Auctioneers had sold more than US$1 billion of equipment through unreserved auctions. It took only three more years for the company to gross another US$1 billion in sales.

International expansion 
In the late 1980s Ritchie Bros. Auctioneers began to look overseas for further growth opportunities. The company conducted its first auctions outside North America in 1987, in Liverpool, the U.K., and Rotterdam, the Netherlands. The equipment sold at the Liverpool auction had been used to rebuild the Falkland Islands following the war there. Further international expansion followed with the company's first auctions in Australia (1990), Mexico (1995), the Middle East (1997), Africa (2003), China (2013), and Finland (2013).

In 1991, the company achieved another milestone when it conducted its 1,000th unreserved auction. It conducted its 2,000th auction in the year 2000.

The role of technology 
In 1989, Ritchie Bros. became the first industrial auction company to enable remote bidding via video when it broadcast its Edmonton auction live at the Agricom trade show in Edmonton, Alberta, Canada. Video simulcasts were held at trade shows in 1993 and 1995, followed in 1997 by a three-way videoconferenced auction that linked separate auction sites in St. Paul, Minnesota; Kansas City, Missouri; and Clinton, Wisconsin. Equipment was located at all three sites, and interested buyers could bid at any of the sites, which were linked via video.

The company launched its website, rbauction.com, at the ConExpo trade show in Las Vegas, Nevada, USA in 1996. The site featured a searchable database that enabled customers to see all of the equipment being sold in upcoming Ritchie Bros. auctions.

In March 1999, Ritchie Bros. broadcast an auction over the Internet for the first time. In March 2002, Ritchie Bros. introduced its real-time Internet bidding service.

In 2016, Ritchie Bros. launched its mobile app, allowing people to search, find and bid on equipment via mobile devices.

In 2018, the company launched  RB Asset Solutions, a cloud-based asset management and disposition system with a complete inventory management system, data analytics and dashboards, e-commerce sites, and other functions.

Going public 
In 1998, the year that Ritchie Bros. went public, the company's annual gross auction proceeds exceeded US$1 billion for the first time ever. Its common shares were listed on the New York Stock Exchange under the symbol RBA in March 1998, followed by listing on the Toronto Stock Exchange in April 2004.

Network of auction sites 
Investing in permanent auction sites has been a company priority since the 1970s. Ritchie Bros. opened its first permanent auction site in Nisku (Edmonton), Alberta, Canada in 1976. Before going public in 1998, the company opened additional permanent auction sites in Vancouver, B.C. (in 1979); Prince George, B.C. (1980); Denver, Colorado (1985) – the first site in the U.S.; Phoenix, Arizona (1987); Toronto, Ontario (1988); Tampa, Florida (1995); Atlanta, Georgia (1996); Minneapolis, Minnesota (1991); Houston, Texas (1993); Fort Worth, Texas (1994); Olympia, Washington (1994); and Halifax, Nova Scotia (1997).

Since then, Ritchie Bros. has added auction sites in eight other countries. Today, the company has 40+ auction sites worldwide including:

 USA: Atlanta, GA; Chicago, IL; Chehalis, WA; Columbus, OH; Denver, CO; Fort Worth, TX; Houston, TX; Kansas City, MO; Las Vegas, NV; Los Angeles; Minneapolis, MN; Nashville, TN; North East, MD; North Franklin, CT; Orlando, FL; Phoenix, AZ; Sacramento, CA; Salt Lake City, UT; Tipton, CA
 Canada: Chilliwack, BC; Edmonton, AB; Grande Prairie, AB; Lethbridge, AB; North Battleford, SK; Montreal, QC; Regina, SK; Saskatoon, SK; Toronto, ON; Truro, NS
 Mexico: Polotitlan
 Europe: Caorso, Italy; Maltby, England; Meppen, Germany; Moerdijk, Netherlands; Mesa de Ocaña, Spain; Saint-Aubin-sur-Gaillon, France
 The Middle East: Dubai
 Japan: Narita
 Australia: Brisbane; Geelong

Acquisitions 
In 1999, Ritchie Bros. acquired Forke Brothers, an equipment auction company based in Nebraska, USA and one of its major competitors. The company moved its U.S. headquarters to Lincoln, Nebraska following the acquisition. Ritchie Bros. made its foray into the agricultural equipment auction business with the acquisitions of All Peace Auctions of Grande Prairie, Alberta, Canada in 2002; LeBlanc Auction Service of Estevan, Saskatchewan, Canada in 2004; Dennis Biliske Auctioneers of Buxton, North Dakota, USA in 2006; Clarke Auctioneers of Rouleau, Saskatchewan, Canada in 2007; and Martella Auction Company of Tipton, CA in 2009. In August 2016, the company announced its plan to acquire IronPlanet, Inc., an online auction company. The deal was approved by the DOJ and closed in May 2017. In 2016, Ritchie Bros. also acquired Petrowsky Auctioneers based in North Franklin, CT and Kramer Auctions, a Canadian agricultural auction company based in North Battleford, SK. In 2018, Ritchie Bros. acquired Leake Auction Company, an Oklahoma-based collector car auctioneer. In August 2021, the acquisition of Euro Auctions, a Northern Ireland auction house that buys and sells industrial plant, construction equipment, and agricultural machinery for £775 million was announced.

Notable auctions 
Among the notable auctions conducted by Ritchie Bros. Auctioneers: construction and other equipment used to rebuild the airport, shipyard and other facilities after the Falkland Islands war (1987); almost 9,800 items and pieces of equipment used in the US$1 billion cleanup operation following the Exxon Valdez oil spill in Alaska (1990) and the equipment used to build the Confederation Bridge that links the province of Prince Edward Island with the Canadian mainland (1997).

Ritchie Bros. also conducted the world's largest industrial equipment auction, and their largest in company history, in Orlando, FL in February 2019. The company sold more than US$297 million worth of equipment and trucks over six days (February 18–23, 2019). The auction featured more than 13,350 heavy equipment items and trucks and attracted more than 15,900 bidders from 88 countries.

50th Anniversary  
Ritchie Bros. celebrated its 50th anniversary in 2008. As a gift to the heavy equipment industries it launched RitchieWiki in September 2008 at MINExpo International in Las Vegas, Nevada.

In 2008 Ritchie Bros. Auctioneers Inc. conducted 340 unreserved industrial and agricultural auctions generating gross auction proceeds of US$3.58 billion. The company sold more than 253,000 lots from 37,000 consignments and processed 277,000 bidder registrations. Of those, 84,000 were successful buyers with a total of 16,000 buyers purchasing their equipment online.

The Company Today  
In 2018, Ritchie Bros. reported US$4.9 billion in Gross Transactional Value (GTV).

Company Management 
Ann Fandozzi is Ritchie Bros.' CEO. Other notable management team members at Ritchie Bros. include Todd Wohler (CHRO), Marianne Marck (CITO), Matt Ackley (Chief Marketing Office), Karl Werner (President, International), Jeff Jeter (President, USA), Kari Taylor (President, U.S. & Mexico Regions), Brian Glenn (SVP, Head of Sales, Canada), Doug Feick (SVP, New Business & Corporate Development), Kieran Holm (SVP, Operations Excellence & Efficiencies), and Darren Watt (SVP & General Counsel).

The board of directors of Ritchie Bros. includes Beverley Briscoe (Chair of the Board), Robert Elton, Amy Guggenheim Shenkan, Erik Olsson, Edward Pitoniak, Sarah Raiss, J. Kim Fennell, and Christopher Zimmerman.

References

External links 
Official Ritchie Bros. parent company website
Official Ritchie Bros. Auctioneers website
Official IronPlanet website

Companies listed on the New York Stock Exchange
Companies listed on the Toronto Stock Exchange
Companies based in Burnaby
Business services companies established in 1958
Distribution companies of Canada
Canadian auction houses
1958 establishments in British Columbia
Canadian companies established in 1958